The Ala Wai Canal is an artificial waterway in Honolulu, Hawaii which serves as the northern boundary of the tourist district of Waikiki. It was created in 1928 to drain the rice paddies and swamps which would eventually become Waikiki. It also serves as a primary drainage corridor for the rivers and streams that run through central and east Honolulu.

The canal runs from just northwest of Kapahulu Avenue along the length of Waikiki, then turns southwest to empty into the Pacific Ocean. Bridges cross the canal at McCully Street, Kalākaua Avenue, and Ala Moana Boulevard. Ala Wai Boulevard runs parallel to the west side of the canal in Waikiki.

History

Before the canal existed, Waikiki consisted of wetlands which were fed by streams running from the Makiki, Palolo, and Manoa valleys to the sea. In the early 1900s, Lucius Pinkham, then President of the Territorial Board of Health, proposed to construct a drainage canal to drain the wetlands, which he considered "unsanitary." Although the canal proposal was approved by the Board of Health, final approval did not occur until Pinkham became Governor of Hawaii.

Construction of the canal by Walter F. Dillingham's Hawaiian Dredging Construction Company, began in 1921 and was completed in 1928. When the city was issuing permits for new buildings in Waikiki they required builders to build above sea level. Dillingham sold the spoil he had dredged in creating the canal so builders could increase the elevation of the newly-created land. The canal is routinely dredged to this day.

The creation of the canal shunted the flow of the streams directly into the ocean, which resulted in the creation of several square miles of new real estate. Among those who benefited from the development were people who, though of modest means, had obtained and maintained small rice and bean farms.
The reclamation of these lands were considered pivotal in the eventual development of Waikiki as a tourist center.

As originally designed, the canal's two-mile long waterway had two outlets, one on either end, which allowed sediment to be flushed into the ocean. Engineers decided not to build the eastern outlet, near Kapiolani Park and the Waikiki Natatorium when they determined that contamination from that end would be deposited on the beach at Waikiki.

Major concerns

One major concern raised by federal flood experts seeking to sell a gigantic USACE project is that heavy rain could cause the canal to overflow, potentially inundating the area from Diamond Head to Ala Moana and Moiliili with up to five feet of water. To prevent such a disaster, the U.S. Army Corps of Engineers has examined various measures, including digging a deeper channel, widening the McCully bridge, and adding walls along the canal.

Another major issue is the pollution in the canal brought about by urbanization. In addition to runoff from streets and growing neighborhoods, mercury was detected in the canal. The mercury was attributed to the boat paint used in the Ala Wai Harbor. A 1976 Department of Health report also said that canal water regularly violated federal limits on fecal coliform counts, an indicator of high bacteria levels.

The canal has been dredged at least three times, in 1967, 1978 and 2002. Most of the dredged sediment was deposited in the ocean, except for some sediment from the 2002 dredging, which was deemed too toxic and instead used for landfill at Honolulu International Airport.

In March 2006, heavy thunderstorms and rains overwhelmed the sewers around the Ala Wai Canal, causing a pressurized sewage line to break. This diversion caused partial overflowing of the canal in some areas, and the sewage then tainted Waikiki and nearby beaches. The beaches near the Ala Wai Canal, including beaches in the Waikiki and Ala Moana districts were closed temporarily due to health concerns. In the weeks after the incident, beaches were eventually reopened, but it took several months before the Ala Wai Canal was determined to be safe and free from major health concerns. One person died from septic shock after falling into the Ala Wai Harbor near the mouth of the canal, with his death being attributed by some to the higher levels of bacteria present after the flood.

Despite the canal repeatedly falling short of meeting safety standards for paddling and recreational use, there has been no move to prohibit such use. Hundreds of paddlers and boaters make it one of the most used inland waterways in the state.

In 2022, researchers from the Department of Oceanography, University of Hawai‘i at Mānoa, published a paper  detailing the toxic levels of flesh-eating bacteria in the canal. Additionally, with the current worldwide environmental changes, the scientists' work, "suggest a 2- to 3-fold increase in average V. vulnificus density in the Ala Wai Canal by 2100".

Photos

See also
Ala Wai Harbor
Kuhio Beach Park

References

External links
360 Aerial Panorama of Ala Wai Canal and its Drainage Area from Hawaii Panoramas

Canals in Hawaii
Geography of Honolulu
Historic American Engineering Record in Hawaii
Transportation in Honolulu
Canals opened in 1928
1928 establishments in Hawaii